Hughes AN/TPQ-36 Firefinder weapon locating system is a mobile radar system developed in the mid-late 1970s by Hughes Aircraft Company and manufactured by Northrop Grumman and ThalesRaytheonSystems, achieving initial operational capability in May 1982. The system is a "weapon-locating radar", designed to detect and track incoming mortar, artillery and rocket fire to determine the point of origin for counter-battery fire. It is currently in service at battalion and higher levels in the United States Army, United States Marine Corps, Australian Army, Portuguese Army, Turkish Army, and the Armed Forces of Ukraine.

The radar is typically trailer-mounted and towed by a Humvee.

Upgrades
Firefinder (V)7 adds a modular azimuth position system (MAPS). MAPS has a north seeking laser gyrocompass and a microprocessor controlled Honeywell H-726 inertial navigation system. Prior Firefinders used a survey team to find site latitude, longitude, and direction to North. With MAPS, reaction time was limited only by the time taken to set up the site, since system geo-position was pre-loaded before sortie deployment. Crew was reduced from 8 to 6.

Firefinder (V)8 extends system performance, improves operator survivability and lowers life cycle cost. Greater processing power and the addition of a low noise amplifier to the radar antenna improves detection range (by up to 50%) and performance accuracy against certain threats.

Operations/maintainers/specifications

The AN/TPQ-36 is an electronically steered radar, meaning the radar antenna does not actually move while in operation. The radar antenna may however be moved manually if required. The system may also be operated in a friendly fire mode to determine the accuracy of counterbattery return fire, or for conducting radar registration or mean point of impact calibrations for friendly artillery.

It can locate mortars, artillery, and rocket launchers, simultaneously locate 10 weapons, locate targets on first round and perform high-burst, datum-plane, and impact registrations.
It can be used to adjust friendly fire, interfaces with tactical fire and predicts the impact of hostile projectiles.

Its azimuth sector is 90°.
It operates in the X-band at 32 frequencies.
Peak transmitted power is 23 kW, min.

It features permanent storage for 99 targets, has a field exercise mode and uses a digital data interface.

Manufacturers
Northrop Grumman manufactures the AN/TPQ-36(V)8 Firefinder radar.
Before its acquisition by Raytheon, the Hughes Aircraft Co. developed the AN/TPQ-36 Firefinder radar at its facility at Fullerton, California, and manufactured it at its plant in Forest, Mississippi.

Nomenclature

Per the Joint Electronics Type Designation System (JETDS), the nomenclature AN/TPQ-36 is thus derived:

 "AN/" indicating Army/Navy(Marines)--a system nomenclature derived from the JETDS.
 "T" for 'transportable', indicating it is carried by a vehicle but is not an integral part of said vehicle (compare with 'V' for vehicle-mounted).
 "P" indicating a position finder (radar).
 "Q" for a special-purpose(multipurpose) radar, in this case counterbattery.
 "36" is the 36'th version of this family, of TPQ radars.

Users 

 : Used by Australian Defence Force
 : Used by Royal Netherlands Army
 : Used by Portuguese Army (5th Artillery Regiment)
 : Used by Spanish Army
 : Used by Sri Lankan Army
 : Used by Turkish Land Forces
 :
 Two units delivered by US Army in 2015.
 Five units delivered by the Netherlands Ministry of Defence in March 2022, during the 2022 Russian invasion of Ukraine.
Ten units delivered by US Army on April 13, 2022, 3 more deliveries on May 19, during the 2022 Russian invasion of Ukraine.
 : Used by United States Army, United States Marine Corps

See also
AN/MPQ-64
ARTHUR (military)
Red Color
SLC-2 Radar
Swathi Weapon Locating Radar

References

External links 
Product Description for AN/TPQ-36 from ThalesRaytheonSystems
TPQ-36 Radar Data Sheet from ThalesRaytheonSystems
Fact sheet for the AN/TPQ-36 from Raytheon
ROCS new upgrades for TPQ-36/37 from BES Systems
Fact file for the AN/TPQ-36 from GlobalSecurity.org

Ground radars
Hughes Aircraft Company
Military radars of the United States
Northrop Grumman radars
Radar equipment of the Cold War
Raytheon Company products
Weapon Locating Radar
Military radars of the United States Marine Corps
Military equipment introduced in the 1980s